The Tupamaros West-Berlin (TW) were a small German Marxist organization which carried out a series of bombings and arsons at the end of the 1960s. In 1969 Dieter Kunzelmann, Georg von Rauch, and a few others traveled to Jordan to train at a Fatah camp, forming the Tupamaros on their return to Germany. The group took their name from the Uruguayan Tupamaros. The TW had a core membership of about 15 people.

Their first action was an attempted bombing of West Berlin's Jewish Community Centre on November 9, 1969 (the anniversary of Kristallnacht); the bomb, supplied by the undercover government agent Peter Urbach, failed to explode. This was followed in the fall of 1969 by a number of bombings and arsons targeting police, judges, and US and Israeli targets. The TW claimed responsibility for these attacks under a variety of different names in order to exaggerate the size of their movement.

The group was led by Kunzelmann and von Rauch, and dissolved after the former was arrested in 1970 and the latter was killed by police in 1971. Its core members then formed the Movement 2 June, while some others joined the Red Army Faction.

The Jewish Community Centre bombing
Historian Wolfgang Kraushaar's 2005 book on the Tupamaros' attempted bombing of the West Berlin Jewish Community Centre set off a debate on antisemitism in the German student movement. The bombing was allegedly planned by Kunzelmann and the bomb itself planted by Albert Fichter, brother of the Sozialistischer Deutscher Studentenbund's then-chairman Tilman Fichter.  On the date of the attempted bombing more than 200 people had gathered in the community center to commemorate Kristallnacht.

The Tupamaros Munich
Around the time of the TW's creation Fritz Teufel formed a similar group in Munich, the Tupamaros Munich (TM). Brigitte Mohnhaupt, later an important figure in the second generation of the RAF, was a member.

References

Antisemitism in Germany
Außerparlamentarische Opposition
Far-left politics in Germany
Left-wing militant groups in Germany
Terrorism in Germany
1969 establishments in Germany
1971 disestablishments in Germany
Politics of Berlin
20th-century attacks on synagogues and Jewish communal organizations
Communist terrorism
1960s in West Berlin
Left-wing antisemitism